Craig Woodcroft (born December 3, 1969) is a Canadian professional ice hockey head coach and former forward. He is currently head coach of HC Dinamo Minsk of the Kontinental Hockey League (KHL).

During his playing career, he represented Team Canada internationally and spent nine years playing in Europe. He previously coached Adler Mannheim of the Deutsche Eishockey Liga (DEL) and Genève-Servette HC of the National League (NL). His brother Jay is head coach for the Edmonton Oilers of the NHL and his other brother Todd is head coach of the University of Vermont men's hockey team

Playing career 
Woodcroft amassed 168 points (73 goals, 95 assists) over his four-year NCAA career at Colgate University. Woodcroft was presented with the Colgate Coaches Award in 1989 and hauled in ECACH Tournament MVP distinction the following year, helping the Raiders capture the Eastern Collegiate Athletic Conference championship. As a senior, he was named Colgate's Best Offensive Player and earned All-ECACH Honorable Mention status.

A 1991 graduate of Colgate University, Woodcroft was picked by the Chicago Blackhawks in the 1988 NHL Draft (134th overall). Following playing college hockey, he turned pro and signed with the Indianapolis Ice of the International Hockey League, where he stayed from 1991 to 1993, followed by a stint with the Prince Edward Island Senators of the American Hockey League in 1993-94.

Woodcroft made 12 appearances for Finnish Liiga side TuTo Hockey in 1994-95 and then was sent to lower division team Reipas Lahti on loan, where he saw the ice in three contests, before heading back to North America. He finished the season playing a couple of games for IHL's Cleveland Lumberjacks and strengthening ECHL outfit Columbus Chill in 19 games.

At the beginning of the 1995-96 campaign, Woodcroft took up an offer to play in Germany: Woodcroft parted ways with Deggendorfer EC after two games, but remained in the country to join fellow German second-division team EV Weiden. At Weiden, he produced 13 goals and 22 assists in 28 contests.

After playing briefly for AHL's Cornwall Aces and Colonial Hockey League's Quad City Mallards, Woodcroft embarked on a two-year stint with Manchester Storm of the British Ice Hockey Superleague (BISL). In England, Woodcroft is particularly remembered for a four-goal showing in a 7-0 European Hockey League home win over Czech powerhouse Sparta Praha in the 1997-98 season. He garnered All-BISL First Team honors in his second year with the Storm. That drew the interest of a high caliber team from Germany's top-tier Deutsche Eishockey Liga (DEL), Kölner Haie. He signed with the team for the 1998-99 season, followed by stints with three other DEL teams in the following three years, including the Kassel Huskies, Frankfurt Lions and Moskitos Essen.

Woodcroft concluded his professional career playing in Italy (HC Milan) and Sweden (Linköping HC) in 2002-03.

Coaching career 
Woodcroft is the founder of the Northern Edge Hockey Academy. In 2010-11, he served as president of Hockey Operations for the Sioux City Musketeers of the United States Hockey League.

Woodcroft served as Skill Development Coach for the St. Louis Blues from 2010 to 2012 and was director of the Nashville Predators' Rookie Development Camp between 2012 and 2014.

In 2014, Woodcroft signed a two-year deal as associate coach of German DEL side Adler Mannheim. In his first year, serving under head coach Geoff Ward, Woodcroft helped guide the Adler squad to the German championship title. In February 2016, he was promoted to Adler Mannheim head coach after Greg Ireland was fired. Woodcroft left Mannheim after the 2015-16 season and was named head coach of HC Dinamo Minsk of the Kontinental Hockey League (KHL) in April 2016.

On June 26, 2017, it was announced that Woodcroft would become the new head coach of Genève-Servette HC, signing a three-year deal with the team. On July 25, 2017 he was named an assistant coach of Canada's men's team for the 2018 Winter Olympics in Pyeongchang, Korea. Serving as assistant coach to Willie Desjardins, Woodcroft helped Canada win the 2017 Spengler Cup. He guided Genève-Servette to an 8th place finish in the 2017-18 regular season before falling short to defending champion SC Bern in playoff-quarterfinals. Woodcroft was relieved of his duties as Genève-Servette head coach on April 3, 2018. In July 2019, he again signed with HC Dinamo Minsk to begin a second stint as head coach at the club.

The current head coach of the Kontinental Hockey League club Dynamo (Minsk), which he led earlier in the 2016/2017 season. He was a member of the coaching staff of the national ice hockey team of Belarus as an assistant coach during three Ice Hockey World Championships. From November 2, 2021, the head coach of the Belarus national team.

Career statistics

External links 
 
 http://www.eliteprospects.com/staff.php?staff=16401
 https://web.archive.org/web/20160215234129/http://www.adler-mannheim.de/trainer.php

References 

1969 births
Living people
Canadian ice hockey forwards
Chicago Blackhawks draft picks
Cleveland Lumberjacks players
Colgate Raiders men's ice hockey players
Columbus Chill players
Cornwall Aces players
Deutsche Eishockey Liga coaches
Essen Mosquitoes players
Frankfurt Lions players
Ice hockey coaches
Indianapolis Ice players
Kassel Huskies players
Kölner Haie players
Linköping HC players
Manchester Storm (1995–2002) players
Prince Edward Island Senators players
Quad City Mallards (CoHL) players
Ice hockey people from Toronto
Straubing Tigers players
TuTo players
Canadian ice hockey coaches